Barium orthotitanate is the inorganic compound with the chemical formula Ba2TiO4.  It is a colourless solid that is of interest because of its relationship to barium titanate, a useful electroceramic.

Structure

The solid has two known phases: a low-temperature (β) phase with P21/n symmetry and a high-temperature (α′) phase with P21nb symmetry.  The structure of Ba2TiO4 is unusual among the titanates because its titanium atoms sit in a four-oxygen tetrahedron rather than a six-oxygen octahedron.

Production
It forms as white crystals from a melt of BaCl2, BaCO3 and TiO2 or from just sintering  BaCO3 and TiO2.  Another method of preparation is heating pellets of Ba(OH)2 and TiO2.  Additionally, there are polymer precursor, sol-gel and reverse micellar routes to Ba2TiO4 synthesis.  Ba2TiO4 has also been successfully grown as a thin film with chemical vapor deposition.

Properties
 Room temperature entropy - 47.0 cal/deg. mol 
 Dielectric constant - 20 (at 100 kHz) 
 It is hygroscopic and decomposes with swelling in moist air.

  +  →   +

References

Titanates
Barium compounds